Pseudis bolbodactyla is a species of frog in the family Hylidae. It is endemic to southern Brazil and occurs in Minas Gerais, southern Goiás, southern Bahia, and northern Espírito Santo states. Although it is currently considered a valid species, it has also been treated as a subspecies of Pseudis paradoxa.

Description
Adult males measure  and adult females  in snout–vent length. The overall appearance is robust. The head is about as wide as it is long and the snout is rounded. The tympanum is distinct, elliptical in shape. The eyes are big. The toes are fully webbed. Skin is dorsally rugose with many tiny tubercles. Preserved specimens are dorsally brown, with darker markings that may be interconnected but do not form any regular pattern.

Habitat and ecology
This almost purely aquatic species occurs in lakes, ponds and other bodies of water in Cerrado and Caatinga savanna at elevations below . One study suggests that it only occurs in ponds with aquatic vegetation. It is often found floating at the water surface, anchored motionless to the leaves of aquatic plants, with only the eyes, nostrils, and tympanum out of the water. It appears to use both visual and sensory clues to detect threats, to which it responds by diving. Breeding takes place in water.

Pseudis bolbodactyla is active both day and night. A study from Goiás found diet consisting primarily of insects, with a minor contribution of arachnids. The majority of the diet were diurnal insects associated with vegetation. Aquatic insects made a small contribution, and then as winged adults only. Pseudis bolbodactyla appears to be an opportunistic sit-and-wait predator.

Conservation
Pseudis bolbodactyla is a common species that can suffer from overgrazing by domestic livestock, infrastructure development (including dams), and water pollution from agriculture. It is present in some protected areas.

References

bolbodactyla
Amphibians of Brazil
Endemic fauna of Brazil
Amphibians described in 1925
Taxa named by Adolfo Lutz
Taxonomy articles created by Polbot